Events from the year 1692 in art.

Events
 The Academy of Fine Arts Vienna is founded by the court painter Peter Strudel.
 Godfrey Kneller, court painter in England, is knighted.
 On a winter evening, painter Emanuel de Witte commits suicide by jumping from a bridge with a rope around his neck.  The canal freezes over and his body is not found for several weeks.

Paintings

 Antoine Coypel – Democritus
 Cornelis Dusart – The Pedlar
 Sir Godfrey Kneller – Portraits of Lord Archibald Hamilton and Katharine Howard
 Hyacinthe Rigaud
 La famille Léonard
 Portrait of Martin Desjardins
 Johann Michael Rottmayr – The Baptism of St. Ottilia by St. Erhard (Erhardkirche, Salzburg)
 Dome of the Monastery of the Holy Trinity, Meteora, Greece

Births
 June 13 – Joseph Highmore, British portrait and historical painter (died 1780)
 September 1 (baptized) – Egid Quirin Asam, German plasterer and sculptor active during the period of the Late Baroque (died 1750)
 date unknown
 Antonio Baldi, Italian painter and engraver (died 1768)
 Vittorio Bigari, Italian painter (died 1776)
 Giovanni Domenico Campiglia, Italian painter and engraver from Florence (died 1768)
 Giovanni Domenico Ferretti, Italian Rococo-style painter from Florence (died 1768)
 Jacob Folkema, Dutch designer and engraver (died 1767)
 Giovanni Giacomo Monti, Italian painter of quadratura (d. unknown)
 Francesco Zucchi, Italian engraver (died 1764)

Deaths
 January 3 – Roelant Roghman, Dutch Golden Age painter and engraver (born 1627)
 March – Willem de Heusch, Dutch landscape painter (born 1625)
 April – Abraham-César Lamoureux, French sculptor working in Scandinavia (buried April 27)
 April 23 – Pieter Withoos, Dutch Golden Age painter (born 1655)
 July – David Loggan, Danzig-born English artist (born 1635)
 July 22 – Pietro del Po, Italian painter (born 1616)
 September 28 – Cornelis Bloemaert, Dutch painter and engraver (born 1603)
 date unknown
 Pietro Aquila, Italian painter and printmaker (born 1630)
 Charles Beaubrun, French portrait painter (born 1604)
 José de Cieza, Spanish painter (born 1656)
 Prosper Henricus Lankrink, Flemish painter and art collector working in England (born 1628)
 Theodore Poulakis, Greek Renaissance painter (born 1622)
 Emanuel de Witte, Dutch perspective painter (born 1617)

References

 
Years of the 17th century in art
1690s in art